Wallace Edward Bunker (born January 25, 1945) is a former Major League Baseball pitcher.

Biography
Bunker pitched for the Capuchino High School varsity baseball team in San Bruno, California, in 1962 and 1963, as the team won the Mid-Peninsula League championships.  He also played on the varsity basketball team. The Baltimore Orioles had ranked him and Dave Boswell as the two best pitching prospects in the country. Not able to afford giving each of them huge bonuses, the ballclub only signed Bunker after being disappointed by Boswell's performance in his senior year of high school.

1964
He became the ace of a staff that also featured Milt Pappas and Robin Roberts. Bunker finished the season 19-5 (to date, the 19 wins are an Oriole rookie single-season record) with a 2.69 earned-run average and won The Sporting News American League Rookie pitcher of the Year Award. He also received the only first-place vote not won by Tony Oliva for the Rookie of the Year honors. That year, the Orioles fell short of the American League pennant, finishing in third place; the New York Yankees won their fifth consecutive pennant, finishing one game ahead of the Chicago White Sox and two games ahead of the Orioles.

So popular had Bunker become in his rookie season that Baltimore mayor Theodore McKeldin, prior to a June 17 game at Memorial Stadium, proclaimed the mound "Baltimore's Bunker Hill"—even christening it with a handful of earth from the actual Bunker Hill. Bunker then defeated the then-first place White Sox 6–1, the victory putting the Orioles in first place. Sixteen days later, he pitched his second one-hitter of the season, defeating the Kansas City Athletics 4–0, the lone hit being Rocky Colavito's fourth-inning double.

Later Oriole Years
After Bunker's rookie season, arm ailments — most likely torn tendons or ligaments of some kind, which often went undiagnosed in Bunker's era — in subsequent seasons prevented him from enjoying a 1964 sequel. A "sore arm" (which, according to Bunker, he incurred in late September 1964, on a cold night in Cleveland) during the  season reduced him to a part-time starter afterwards. In the latter year, the Orioles won the World Series in a four-game sweep of the defending champion Los Angeles Dodgers. In Game 3 of that Series, Bunker outdueled Claude Osteen with a six-hit, 1–0 shutout, which was sandwiched between shutouts by Jim Palmer and Dave McNally as the Orioles set a Series record by not allowing a run for  consecutive innings. (Moe Drabowsky pitched  scoreless innings in relief in Game One to begin the streak.)

Kansas City Royals
On April 8 of that year, he threw the very first pitch in Kansas City Royals history. The Royals defeated the Minnesota Twins 4–3 in 12 innings, with Drabowsky (whom the Royals had also acquired from Baltimore in the expansion draft) gaining the victory in relief.

After the 1969 season, the arm troubles that limited Bunker to a part-time starter shortened his career. Bunker had pitched his final major-league game at just 26 years of age.

In his career, Bunker won 60 games against 52 losses, with 569 strikeouts and a 3.51 earned-run average in  innings pitched. As a batter Bunker had 31 hits in 331 at-bats for a .094 batting average. Defensively, he recorded a .969 fielding percentage which was 16 points higher than the league average at his position.

Bunker's sinker was his most effective pitch in his short career. Mickey Mantle once referred to Bunker's sinker as the type of pitch "you could break your back on."

Author/Illustrator of Children's Literature

Wally Bunker and his wife Kathy were Artists in Residence at Palm Key Nature Getaway in Ridgeland, South Carolina. They began writing and illustrating children's literature under the new "Wal-De-Mar, Friends and Such" collection. A Lowcountry Tale Concerning Wal-De-Mar Wiggins (published April 2015) introduces children to a quaint little bird born in South Carolina's Lowcountry. In I Am Me, (published April 2015) Wal-De-Mar dreams of who he could be and realizes the value of being himself.

Wally and Kathy now live in Coeur d'Alene, Idaho and plan to release other Wal-De-Mar, Friends and Such books in late 2015.

Books  
 2015 "A Lowcountry Tale Concerning Wal-De-Mar Wiggins"  
 2015 "I Am Me"

References

External links
 Bunker's career stats and analysis

1945 births
Baltimore Orioles players
Kansas City Royals players
Stockton Ports players
Omaha Royals players
Rochester Red Wings players
Living people
Baseball players from Seattle
Major League Baseball pitchers
American children's writers